Anatrachyntis terminella is a moth in the family Cosmopterigidae. It was described by Francis Walker in 1864 and is known from Australia (including New South Wales) and Fiji.

The wingspan is about 8 mm. The forewings are patterned and hindwings have trailing hairy fringes.

The larvae have been recorded in deserted nests of wasps of the genus Polistes, galls on flower buds of Acacia binervata, egg sacs of the spider Trichonephila edulis as well as dead insects and dead leaves.

References

Moths described in 1864
Anatrachyntis
Moths of Oceania